Bohdan Anatoliyovych Litvinenko (born 10 February 2003) is a Ukrainian professional footballer who plays as a forward.

Career
Bohdan Lytvynenko is a product of Desna Chernihiv and he started his football career at Desna-3 Chernihiv the Desna U19.

FC Chernihiv 
On summer 2021, moved to FC Chernihiv in the Ukrainian Second League. On 24 July 2021 he made his debut with the new club against MFA Mukacheve, replacing Maksym Chaus at the 76 minute. On 14 August 2021 he scored his first goal in Ukrainian Second League for his new team at the 23 minute against Dnipro Cherkasy at the Chernihiv Arena. In summer 2022, he terminated his contract with FC Chernihiv by mutual consent.

Career statistics

Club

References

External links
 
 
 

2003 births
Living people
Footballers from Chernihiv
Association football forwards
SDYuShOR Desna players
FC Desna-3 Chernihiv players
FC Chernihiv players
Ukrainian footballers
Ukrainian Second League players